This is a list of authors who have written works of fiction in the Russian language. The list encompasses novelists and writers of short fiction.

Alphabetical list

A

B

C

D

E

F

G

H

I

K

L

M

N

O

P

R

S

T

U

V

Y

Z

See also
List of Russian-language writers
List of Russian-language playwrights
List of Russian-language poets
List of Russian artists
List of Russian architects
List of Russian inventors
List of Russian explorers
Russian literature
Russian language
Russian culture

References

Russian novelists
 
 
 
Novelists
 
Russian
Novelists